Salmonsens Konversationsleksikon is a Danish encyclopedia that has been published in several editions.

The first edition, Salmonsens Store Illustrerede Konversationsleksikon was published in nineteen volumes 1893–1911 by Brødrene Salmonsens Forlag, and named after the publisher Isaac Salmonsen. The second edition, Salmonsens Konversationsleksikon, was published in 26 volumes 1915–1930, under the editorship of Christian Blangstrup (volume 1–21), and Johannes Brøndum-Nielsen and Palle Raunkjær (volume 22–26), issued by J. H. Schultz Forlagsboghandel.

Editions
 Salmonsens Store Illustrerede Konversationsleksikon, 19 volumes, Copenhagen: Brødrene Salmonsen, 1893–1911
 Salmonsens Konversationsleksikon, 2nd edition, editors: Christian Blangstrup (I–XXI), Johannes Brøndum-Nielsen and Palle Raunkjær (XXII–XXVI), 26 volumes, Copenhagen: J. H. Schultz Forlagsboghandel, 1915–1930.
 Den Lille Salmonsen, 3rd edition, 12 volumes, Copenhagen, 1937–1940.
 Salmonsen Leksikon-Tidsskrift (SLT), Copenhagen, 1941–1955. A series of booklets issued monthly.
 Den nye Salmonsen, 1 volume, Copenhagen, 1949.

See also
 List of Danish online encyclopedic resources

References

External links 
 Digital facsimile of the second edition, at Projekt Runeberg.

Danish encyclopedias
1893 non-fiction books
1915 non-fiction books
1937 non-fiction books
19th-century encyclopedias
20th-century encyclopedias